Orlando Vernada Woolridge (December 16, 1959 – May 31, 2012) was an American professional basketball player who played in the National Basketball Association (NBA) from 1981 to 1994. He was known for his scoring ability, especially on slam dunks. He played college basketball for the Notre Dame Fighting Irish.

Early life and education
Woolridge was born in Bernice, Louisiana, a town dependent on the lumber industry. After attending local schools, he went to the University of Notre Dame, where he played for the Fighting Irish. He played in the NCAA tournament's Final Four in 1978 as a freshman with teammate Bill Laimbeer (the two would later reunite as teammates of the Detroit Pistons during the 1990s).

Woolridge started every game as a college sophomore, junior and senior. He helped guide Notre Dame to NCAA tournament appearances in 1980 and 1981. The  forward played one season at center in 1979–80, when he made 58.5 percent of his field goals. Named a second-team All-American by The Sporting News in 1981, Woolridge made a last-second fall-away jumper to beat the eventual NBA Hall of Famer Ralph Sampson and No. 1 Virginia to end their 28-game winning streak. Throughout his collegiate career, he averaged 10.6 points, 5 rebounds, 1.2 assists per game and shot just under 60% from the field.

College

|-
| align="left" | 1977–78
| align="left" | Notre Dame
| 24 || - || 9.6 || .526 || - || .485 || 2.1 || 0.5 || - || - || 4.1
|-
| align="left" | 1978–79
| align="left" | Notre Dame
| 30 || 30 || 25.1 || .573 || - || .732 || 4.8 || 1.4 || 0.8 || 0.4 || 11.0
|-
| align="left" | 1979–80
| align="left" | Notre Dame
| 27 || 27 || 30.9 || .585 || - || .692 || 6.9 || 1.5 || 0.7 || 1.1 || 12.2
|-
| align="left" | 1980–81
| align="left" | Notre Dame
| 28 || 28 || 33.0 || .650 || - || .667 || 6.0 || 1.4 || 0.5 || 0.8 || 14.4
|- class="sortbottom"
| style="text-align:center;" colspan="2"| Career
| 109 || 85 || 25.1 || .595 || - || .669 || 5.0 || 1.2 || 0.5 || 0.6 || 10.6
|}

Professional career

NBA
Woolridge was selected sixth in the 1981 NBA draft by the Chicago Bulls, where he played for his first five seasons. Woolridge made his NBA debut on November 7, 1981. Woolridge was named NBA Player of the week on December 9, 1984. During the 1984–85 season, Woolridge averaged 22.9 points per game and combined with rookie teammate Michael Jordan to average over 51 points per game. Prior to the Jordan era, Woolridge was one of the Chicago Bulls' marquee players along with Hall of Famer Artis Gilmore, Reggie Theus and David Greenwood. Woolridge was also one of the original alley-oop artists. Woolridge competed in the NBA Slam Dunk Contest in 1984 and 1985, and was the first to complete what would be called the eastbay funk dunk in 1984 surpassing the scores of Clyde Drexler and Michael Cooper. Woolridge led the Chicago Bulls in scoring in 1986 and was the last player to lead in scoring before Jordan took over. While unstoppable on the open court, his one-dimensional play did not complement Jordan's skills.

He moved on to sign with the New Jersey Nets as a veteran free-agent on October 2, 1986 for the 1986–87 season, in which he averaged 20.7 points per game. After playing 19 games during the 1987–88 season, Woolridge was suspended by the league for violation of the league substance abuse policy.

On August 10, 1988, he signed as an unrestricted free agent with the Los Angeles Lakers, who were looking for a scorer off the bench. "I just love it when we go up in the transition game, up and down the court, Magic (Johnson) looking for the open guy ... That's the way I love playing," said Woolridge about teammate Magic Johnson and the Lakers shortly after joining the team. Woolridge averaged 11 points per game in two seasons and provided the Lakers consistent bench scoring around the basket. His 55.6% field goal percentage during the 1989–90 season ranked fifth in the league.

Woolridge was traded for two second-round draft picks to the Denver Nuggets, which started playing an unusual hurry-up offense under head coach Paul Westhead in 1990–91. The prolific offense resulted in Woolridge's averaging 25.1 points per game and a career high 6.8 rebounds per game, but did not result in many team wins. Through most of the season until December, Woolridge led the NBA in scoring. That month, he was sidelined after eye surgery due to a detached retina during a game collision. He was third in the league averaging 29.0 points at the time.

After his only season in Denver, Woolridge played with the Detroit Pistons during the 1991–92 season. He split the 1992–93 season between the Pistons and the Milwaukee Bucks, and finished his NBA career at the end of the 1993–94 season where he played for the Philadelphia 76ers. He held NBA career averages of 16.0 points, 4.3 rebounds and 1.9 assists per game. He never won an NBA championship

Europe
Woolridge played professionally in Italy, with the Italian League club Benetton Treviso. Playing under head coach Mike D'Antoni, he won the FIBA European Cup in the 1994–95 season, and also won the Italian Cup. Woolridge then signed to play with Buckler Bologna for the 1995–96 season and won the Italian Supercup.

NBA career statistics

Regular season

|-
| align="left" | 1981–82
| align="left" | Chicago
| 75 || 12 || 15.8 || .513 || .000 || .699 || 3.0 || 1.1 || 0.3 || 0.3 || 7.3
|-
| align="left" | 1982–83
| align="left" | Chicago
| 57 || 38 || 28.5 || .580 || .000 || .638 || 5.2 || 1.7 || 0.7 || 0.8 || 16.5
|-
| align="left" | 1983–84
| align="left" | Chicago
| 75 || 74 || 33.9 || .525 || .500 || .715 || 4.9 || 1.8 || 0.9 || 0.8 || 19.3
|-
| align="left" | 1984–85
| align="left" | Chicago
| 77 || 76 || 36.6 || .554 || .000 || .785 || 5.6 || 1.8 || 0.8 || 0.5 || 22.9
|-
| align="left" | 1985–86
| align="left" | Chicago
| 70 || 59 || 32.1 || .495 || .174 || .788 || 5.0 || 3.0 || 0.7 || 0.7 || 20.7
|-
| align="left" | 1986–87
| align="left" | New Jersey
| 75 || 53 || 35.2 || .521 || .125 || .777 || 4.9 || 3.5 || 0.7 || 1.1 || 20.7
|-
| align="left" | 1987–88
| align="left" | New Jersey
| 19 || 12 || 32.7 || .445 || .000 || .708 || 4.8 || 3.7 || 0.7 || 1.1 || 16.4
|-
| align="left" | 1988–89
| align="left" | Los Angeles
| 74 || 0 || 20.1 || .468 || .000 || .738 || 3.6 || 0.8 || 0.4 || 0.9 || 9.7
|-
| align="left" | 1989–90
| align="left" | Los Angeles
| 62 || 2 || 22.9 || .556 || .000 || .733 || 3.0 || 1.5 || 0.6 || 0.7 || 12.7
|-
| align="left" | 1990–91
| align="left" | Denver
| 53 || 50 || 34.4 || .498 || .000 || .797 || 6.8 || 2.2 || 1.3 || 0.4 || 25.1
|-
| align="left" | 1991–92
| align="left" | Detroit
| 82 || 61 || 25.8 || .498 || .111 || .683 || 3.2 || 1.1 || 0.5 || 0.4 || 14.0
|-
| align="left" | 1992–93
| align="left" | Detroit
| 50 || 47 || 29.5 || .479 || .000 || .673 || 3.5 || 2.2 || 0.5 || 0.5 || 13.1
|-
| align="left" | 1992–93
| align="left" | Milwaukee
| 8 || 0 || 9.8 || .545 || .000 || .778 || 1.1 || 0.4 || 0.1 || 0.3 || 5.4
|-
| align="left" | 1993–94
| align="left" | Philadelphia
| 74 || 1 || 26.4 || .471 || .071 || .689 || 4.0 || 1.9 || 0.6 || 0.8 || 12.7
|- class="sortbottom"
| style="text-align:center;" colspan="2"| Career
| 851 || 485 || 28.3 || .513 || .091 || .737 || 4.3 || 1.9 || 0.6 || 0.7 || 16.0
|}

Playoffs

|-
| align="left" | 1984–85
| align="left" | Chicago
| 4 || 4 || 41.8 || .500 || .000 || .778 || 3.3 || 2.0 || 1.5 || 0.3 || 20.5
|-
| align="left" | 1985–86
| align="left" | Chicago
| 3 || 3 || 45.0 || .403 || .000 || .867 || 4.7 || 1.3 || 1.0 || 0.3 || 21.0
|-
| align="left" | 1988–89
| align="left" | Los Angeles
| 15 || 0 || 18.4 || .520 || .000 || .710 || 4.7 || 1.1 || 0.1 || 1.0 || 8.1
|-
| align="left" | 1989–90
| align="left" | Los Angeles
| 9 || 0 || 22.1 || .571 || .000 || .703 || 2.6 || 1.1 || 0.9 || 0.9 || 11.8
|-
| align="left" | 1991–92
| align="left" | Detroit
| 5 || 5 || 25.6 || .442 || .000 || .563 || 2.0 || 0.6 || 0.2 || 0.2 || 11.0
|- class="sortbottom"
| style="text-align:center;" colspan="2"| Career
| 36 || 12 || 25.1 || .492 || .000 || .716 || 3.6 || 1.2 || 0.6 || 0.7 || 11.9
|}

Coaching and later years
After retiring as a player, Woolridge coached the Los Angeles Sparks of the WNBA in 1998 and 1999. Woolridge later coached the Arizona Rhinos of the ABA from 2008 to 2009.

Personal life and death
Woolridge's son, Renaldo, also became a professional basketball player. Woolridge was a cousin to Naismith Memorial Basketball Hall of Fame member Willis Reed.

After a long battle with heart disease, Woolridge died on May 31, 2012, at his parents' home in Mansfield, Louisiana.

References

External links

 FIBA EuroLeague Profile
 Italian League Profile 

1959 births
2012 deaths
African-American basketball coaches
African-American basketball players
American expatriate basketball people in Italy
American men's basketball coaches
American men's basketball players
American women's basketball coaches
Basketball coaches from Louisiana
Basketball players from Louisiana
Chicago Bulls draft picks
Chicago Bulls players
Denver Nuggets players
Detroit Pistons players
Los Angeles Lakers players
Los Angeles Sparks head coaches
Milwaukee Bucks players
Notre Dame Fighting Irish men's basketball players
Pallacanestro Treviso players
People from Bernice, Louisiana
Philadelphia 76ers players
Small forwards
Virtus Bologna players
20th-century African-American sportspeople
21st-century African-American people